The Sun, the Genome, and the Internet is a non-fiction scientific book by renowned physicist Freeman J. Dyson, Professor Emeritus of Physics at the Institute for Advanced Study, Princeton University in the U.S.A. This short book was originally published in 1999 by the Oxford University Press.

Synopsis

Professor Dyson suggests that three rapidly advancing technologies, Solar Energy, Genetic Engineering and World-Wide Communication together have the potential to create a more equal distribution of the world's wealth. Amongst other things he proposes that solar power in the Third World could connect even the most remote areas to all of the information on the Internet, potentially ending the cultural isolation of the poorest countries. Likewise, breakthroughs in genetics could lead to more efficient crops, thereby engendering the renewed vitality of traditional village life, currently devalued by the global market.

Reviews
'A most engaging and important book, as accessible as it is profound.' - Oliver Sacks
'A thought-provoking glimpse into the 21st century...Only Dyson could weave together this rich tapestry, blending ethics, ideology, science and technology into a coherent vision of the future.' - Michio Kaku, author of Hyperspace and Visions: How Science Will Revolutionize the 21st Century

References

1999 non-fiction books
Science books
Sociology books
Oxford University Press books
Works by Freeman Dyson